Esther Termens Cañabate (born November 2, 1984 in Terrassa, Catalonia) is a field hockey midfield player from Spain. She represented her native country at the 2004 Summer Olympics in Athens, Greece. Termens was a key member of the Spanish national team that finished fourth at the 2006 Women's Hockey World Cup in Madrid.

References
 Spanish Olympic Committee

External links
 

1984 births
Living people
Spanish female field hockey players
Field hockey players from Catalonia
Olympic field hockey players of Spain
Field hockey players at the 2004 Summer Olympics
Field hockey players at the 2008 Summer Olympics
Atlètic Terrassa players
Sportspeople from Terrassa